Kelly Michael Buchberger (born December 2, 1966) is a Canadian professional ice hockey coach and former player. He played for several National Hockey League teams from 1986 to 2004. As a coach, he has been an assistant for the New York Islanders of the National Hockey League (NHL) and a head coach of the Tri City Americans of the Western Hockey League (WHL).

Playing career
Buchberger has played for the Edmonton Oilers, Atlanta Thrashers, Los Angeles Kings, Phoenix Coyotes, and the Pittsburgh Penguins.  He also played minor hockey with the Western Hockey League Moose Jaw Warriors and pro hockey with the American Hockey League Nova Scotia Oilers.

He was drafted in the ninth round by the Edmonton Oilers in the 1985 NHL Entry Draft, making him the 188th overall pick.  He made his NHL debut in 1987 Stanley Cup finals.  During his playing career, he was known best for his gritty play and leadership, having captained the Oilers for four years as the team's 9th leader in franchise history. He won two Stanley Cups with Edmonton, in 1987 and 1990.

Buchberger was the last remaining active member of the Oilers' roster to have been on one of their five Stanley Cup-winning teams, along with Marty McSorley. He remained with the Oilers until 1999, when he was selected by the Atlanta Thrashers in the 1999 NHL Expansion Draft.

Coaching career
After retiring, Buchberger was an assistant coach with the AHL Edmonton Road Runners team in 2004–05. He then joined the Oilers management as a development coach. On August 3, 2007, he was named head coach of the Oilers' American Hockey League affiliate, the Springfield Falcons, and guided the team to a 35–35–10 record, the team's first .500 season since 1998–99.  Buchberger then was promoted to the Edmonton Oilers during the 2008 offseason, becoming an assistant coach with them.  On June 10, 2014, he was reassigned to the role of player personnel and replaced as assistant coach by Craig Ramsay.

On July 11, 2017, Buchberger was hired as the assistant coach by the New York Islanders. In 2018, he was named the head coach of the Tri-City Americans in the Western Hockey League. In 2021, his contract with the Americans was not renewed.

Career statistics

Regular season and playoffs

International

Coaching record

Awards and honours

See also
List of NHL players with 1000 games played
List of NHL players with 2000 career penalty minutes

References

External links

1966 births
Living people
Atlanta Thrashers captains
Atlanta Thrashers players
Canadian ice hockey right wingers
Canadian people of German descent
Edmonton Oilers coaches
Edmonton Oilers draft picks
Edmonton Oilers executives
Edmonton Oilers players
Ice hockey people from Saskatchewan
Los Angeles Kings players
Moose Jaw Warriors players
Phoenix Coyotes players
Pittsburgh Penguins players
Springfield Falcons coaches
Stanley Cup champions
New York Islanders coaches
Canadian ice hockey coaches